Melbourne tram route 31 was operated by Yarra Trams on the Melbourne tram network from Hoddle Street to Victoria Harbour. The route was designed as a supplementary service along Collins Street, with services running between peak hours with reduced services on weekends.

History
The first version of route 31 ran from St Vincent's Plaza via Collins Street and Southern Cross station to terminate at Collins Street West End. With the rerouting of route 48, route 31 ceased to run.

On 25 October 2010 an amended route 31 was reinstated, running from Hoddle Street, Collingwood to St Vincent's Plaza then via Collins Street and continuing to Victoria Harbour. The service ran on weekdays between the peak hours.

The route was discontinued on 25 July 2014 as part of a wider timetable change to the Yarra Trams network, replaced by a full-time routes 11, 12, 48 and 109 along Collins Street.

Route map

References

External links

031